Modern English School is an English Medium, co-educational Higher Secondary School situated in the city of Jeypore in Koraput district of Odisha, India. The school was established in the year 1989 and is affiliated to Central Board of Secondary Education. It runs classes from Nursery to X. It is recognized as one of the oldest english medium schools in south Odisha.

Facilities 
The school has modern well-equipped, Atal Tinkering Science-Lab, computer lab, language lab, multi-media system, digital classrooms and a library, sports, Junior Red Cross, scout, and house system.

References

See also 
 List of schools in Odisha

Schools in Odisha
Education in Odisha by district
Schools in India
Koraput district
Central Board of Secondary Education